Juliano Elizeu Vicentini (born 26 August 1981) is a Brazilian footballer.

Juliano Vicentini also played 88 matches at Campeonato Brasileiro Série A.

Career
Vicentini started his career at Palmeiras of São Paulo. He signed a 1-year contract with Juventude in January 2005.

In 2006 season he left for Guarani. On 31 August 2006, he signed for Lecce of Serie B. In the next season, he left for Pisa. He then left for Marítimo of Portuguese Liga.
After just played 2 league matches, he signed a 3-month contract with Joinville for Campeonato Catarinense 2009.

In August 2009, he left for Novara.

References

External links
 Profile at Novara 
 Profile at Football.it 
 Profile at CBF 
 Profile at Portuguese Liga 
 Profile at Futpedia 

Brazilian footballers
Brazilian expatriate footballers
Sociedade Esportiva Palmeiras players
Coritiba Foot Ball Club players
Clube Náutico Capibaribe players
CR Flamengo footballers
Esporte Clube Juventude players
Guarani FC players
U.S. Lecce players
Pisa S.C. players
C.S. Marítimo players
Joinville Esporte Clube players
Novara F.C. players
Minnesota United FC (2010–2016) players
Campeonato Brasileiro Série A players
Serie B players
Serie C players
Primeira Liga players
North American Soccer League players
Expatriate footballers in Italy
Expatriate footballers in Portugal
Expatriate soccer players in the United States
Association football midfielders
Footballers from São Paulo (state)
1981 births
Living people